Sojovice is a municipality and village in Mladá Boleslav District in the Central Bohemian Region of the Czech Republic. It has about 600 inhabitants. It lies on the left bank of the Jizera River.

History
The first written mention of Sojovice is from 1360. From 1986 to 1999, it was merged with Skorkov. Since 2000, it has been a separate municipality.

References

Villages in Mladá Boleslav District